The 2011–12 Eerste Divisie, known as Jupiler League for sponsorship reasons, was the fifty-sixth season of Eerste Divisie since its establishment in 1955. It began in August 2011 with the first matches of the season and ended in June 2012 with the nacompetitie, a promotion-and-relegation tournament also involving the 16th- and 17th-placed teams from the 2011–12 Eredivisie. The competition was won by FC Zwolle on 13 April 2012, after drawing FC Eindhoven 0–0 at home in their 32nd match of the season.

On 1 March 2012, the Dutch football federation confirmed that no team would be relegated from the league at the end of the season, after all the 2011–12 Topklasse teams had decided against being eligible for promotion to the Eerste Divisie.

Teams
A total of 18 teams took part in the league. Willem II were relegated as bottom-placed team in the 2010–11 Eredivisie, whereas FC Oss were promoted as 2010–11 Topklasse runners-up, as champions IJsselmeervogels opted to keep playing at amateur level instead. Following the disbandment and consequent exclusion of RBC Roosendaal in June 2011, last-placed 2010–11 Eerste Divisie club Almere City FC were readmitted in the league to fill the vacancy.

The season also saw the participation of the old BV Veendam under their new denomination of SC Veendam.

Managerial changes

League table

Results

Playoffs
VVV-Venlo and De Graafschap joined the Eerste Divisie-teams for the playoffs, after finishing 16th and 17th in the Eredivisie.

Round 1

Round 2

Round 3

Top goalscorers
Updated 27 January 2012

17 goals
  Jack Tuyp (FC Volendam)
12 goals
  Nassir Maachi (FC Zwolle)
11 goals
  Erik Bakker (SC Cambuur)
  Marcel van der Sloot (FC Oss)
10 goals
  Donny de Groot (Willem II)
  Anco Jansen (SC Veendam)
9 goals
  Christopher Bieber (FC Oss)
  Jeremy Bokila (Sparta Rotterdam)
  Cecilio Lopes (FC Dordrecht)
  Johan Plat (Telstar)
  Tom van Weert (FC Den Bosch)

References

Eerste Divisie seasons
Netherlands 2
2011–12 in Dutch football